The Dharangadhra–Surendranagar section belongs to Western Railway of Ahmedabad Division.

History
The Dharangadhra–Surendranagar line was opened in 1905 by Dhrangadhra Railway. The gauge conversion of this section completed in 2011. This line belongs to Dhrangadhra Railway during the Princely rule.

Rail traffic
Only one passenger train passes through this line at present. Another passenger train was announced in Rail budget 2013.

References

5 ft 6 in gauge railways in India
Railway lines in Gujarat
Surendranagar district
Western Railway zone

Railway lines opened in 1905
1905 establishments in India